Compassvale Secondary School (CVSS) is a co-educational government secondary school in Sengkang, Singapore, within walking distance of Compassvale LRT station.

Founded on 2 January 2000, the integrated government school offers secondary education under three academic streams, which lead up to the Singapore-Cambridge GCE Ordinary Level or the Singapore-Cambridge GCE Normal Level examinations.

History 

Compassvale Secondary School was founded on 2 January 2000 in Sengkang. Initially, it was housed in Sengkang Secondary School, and it moved to its current site at Compassvale Crescent on 27 June 2000.

Academic Information 
Being a government secondary school, Compassvale Secondary School offers three academic streams, namely the four-year Express course, as well as the Normal Course, comprising Normal (Academic) and Normal (Technical) academic tracks.

O Level Express Course 
The Express Course is a nationwide four-year programme that leads up to the Singapore-Cambridge GCE Ordinary Level examination.

Normal Course 
The Normal Course is a nationwide 4-year programme leading to the Singapore-Cambridge GCE Normal Level examination, which runs either the Normal (Academic) [N(A)] or Normal (Technical) [N(T)] curriculum.

Normal (Academic) Course 
In the Normal (Academic) course, students offer 5-8 subjects in the Singapore-Cambridge GCE Normal Level examination. Compulsory subjects include:
 English Language
 Mother Tongue Language
 Mathematics
 Combined Humanities
A 5th year leading to the Singapore-Cambridge GCE Ordinary Level examination is available to N(A) students who perform well in their Singapore-Cambridge GCE Normal Level examination. Students can move from one course to another based on their performance and the assessment of the school principal and teachers.

Normal (Technical) Course 
The Normal (Technical) course prepares students for a technical-vocational education at the Institute of Technical Education. Students will offer 5-7 subjects in the Singapore-Cambridge GCE Normal Level examination. The curriculum is tailored towards strengthening students’ proficiency in English and Mathematics. Students take English Language, Mathematics, Basic Mother Tongue and Computer Applications as compulsory subjects.

References

External links 
 Official website

Secondary schools in Singapore
Sengkang
Compassvale
Educational institutions established in 2000
2000 establishments in Singapore